The 1956 UCI Road World Championships took place in Copenhagen, Denmark on a circuit measuring 12.960 km near Ballerup.

Events Summary

References

 
 
  (film about the races)

 
UCI Road World Championships by year
World Championships
Road
International cycle races hosted by Denmark